"The Coming of the Wee Malkies" is a Scots poem by Stephen Mulrine. It was popular with children in Scotland, where it was taught in schools and colleges as an example of poetry written in Glasgow dialect.

References

Scottish poems
Scots-language works
Children's poems
Culture in Glasgow